Archbishop Manuel Franklin da Costa (31 August 1921 – 17 July 2003) was a Roman Catholic Archbishop of  Huambo then Lubango, Angola.

Ordained priest in 1948, da Costa was appointed Bishop of Henrique de Carvalho (now the Diocese of Saurimo) in 1975, just months before Angola achieved recognized independence. In February 1977, da Costa became the Archbishop of Huambo and in 1986, Archbishop of Lubango, where he would stay until his retirement in 1997.

Sources
 Manuel Franklin da Costa catholic-hierarchy.org

1921 births
2003 deaths
20th-century Roman Catholic bishops in Angola
20th-century Roman Catholic archbishops in Angola
People from Lubango
People from Huambo Province
Roman Catholic archbishops of Huambo
Roman Catholic archbishops of Lubango
Roman Catholic bishops of Saurímo